Stefany Ferrer Van Ginkel (born 17 October 1998) is a professional footballer who plays as a midfielder.

Early life
Born in Campo Grande, Brazil, Ferrer Van Ginkel was one of three sisters and was placed in an orphanage at the age of three; all three sisters were eventually adopted by a Spanish family and moved to a village outside Barcelona, Spain.

Ferrer Van Ginkel played youth soccer for C.F.S. Sant Boi, CF Igualada, and Fundació Esportiva Vilafranca. After her college career in the United States, Ferrer Van Ginkel appeared in Ultimate Goal, a British reality competition series on BT Sport.

College career
Ferrer Van Ginkel played American collegiate soccer for the West Virginia Mountaineers.

Club career

RCD Espanyol
Ferrer Van Ginkel helped RCD Espanyol gain promotion.

Tigres UANL
Ferrer Van Ginkel signed for Mexican club Tigres UANL in June 2021; she was the club's first foreign player.

Angel City FC
In January 2022, Ferrer Van Ginkel transferred to American club Angel City FC. On November 14, 2022, Angel City announced that Ferrer Van Ginkel's contract had not been renewed.

References

External links
 
 
 
 

1998 births
Living people
People from Campo Grande
Adoptees
Brazilian emigrants to Spain
Naturalised citizens of Spain
Footballers from Barcelona
Spanish women's footballers
RCD Espanyol Femenino players
West Virginia Mountaineers women's soccer players
Tigres UANL (women) footballers
Angel City FC players
Liga MX Femenil players
Spanish expatriate women's footballers
Spanish expatriate sportspeople in the United States
Expatriate women's soccer players in the United States
Spanish expatriate sportspeople in Mexico
Expatriate women's footballers in Mexico
Spanish people of Brazilian descent
Sportspeople of Brazilian descent
Brazilian women's footballers
Women's association football midfielders
Sportspeople from Mato Grosso do Sul
National Women's Soccer League players